is a Japanese anime television series produced by Studio 3Hz, directed by Kiyotaka Oshiyama, written by Yuniko Ayana, featuring concept art by tanu, character designs by Takashi Kojima, and music composed by To-Mas. It was first announced on March 25, 2016, at the AnimeJapan convention, and aired on AT-X and other networks between October and December 2016. The series is a science fiction adventure story that revolves around two heroines, Papika and Cocona.

Plot
Cocona is a seemingly ordinary middle school student living a normal life with her grandmother. As she ponders over what future career she should take up, she meets an energetic yet eccentric girl named Papika, who immediately takes an interest in Cocona. Without hesitation, she drags her into an organization called Flip Flap.

This organization specializes in retrieving mysterious, amorphous fragments which are said to grant wishes from various alternate dimensions known as Pure Illusion. After completing their first mission, Cocona and Papika are immediately sent to another world in Pure Illusion. As a dangerous creature stalks them, they use their shards to transform into magical girls, Cocona into Pure Blade and Papika into Pure Barrier.

However, as they try to defeat the creature standing before them, three other magical girls from a rival organization barge in and slay the creature, later taking out an amorphous fragment left in its body. Realizing the potential rivalry between them and the rival organization and creatures living in Pure Illusion, Cocona and Papika must learn to work together and synchronize their feelings so that they can transform more effectively.

Characters

Main characters
 

An ordinary school girl in the second year of middle school who finds herself going on bizarre adventures after meeting Papika. She has an amorphous fragment embedded in her left thigh. She is the daughter of Mimi and Salt.
 

An energetic and eccentric girl from the FlipFlap organization who becomes Cocona's partner. After recovering most of the amorphous fragments, she remembers that she was once known as Papikana and was partnered with Mimi.

Cocona's childhood friend, who works for the rival organization Asclepius alongside Toto and Yuyu, often battling them for the amorphous fragments they are seeking. She desires to be close with Cocona and despises Papika for getting in her way. In episode 10 it is revealed that she became friends with Cocona solely for the sake of Asclepius' work. However, she does develop a sweet spot for Cocona, hindering her from collecting amorphous fragments which resulted in her termination from Asclepius. As of episode 11, she officially gains an amorphous fragment for flip flapping.

FlipFlap

The head of the FlipFlap organization, who is intent on seeking out the amorphous fragments for some unknown reason. He is revealed to be an old acquaintance of Papika and Mimi, and is Cocona's father.

A scientist at FlipFlap organization.

A scientist at FlipFlap organization.

A robot that follows Papika everywhere, nicknamed .

Asclepius

An elementary school student and Yuyu's twin brother, who works alongside Yayaka. He, along with his younger sister, are very distant from others to the point where they would abandon a team member for the sake of an amorphous fragment. However, it is shown that they care deeply for each other towards the end of the series when Toto sustains a head injury.

An elementary school student and Toto's twin sister, who works alongside Yayaka. She wears a cast on her left arm when they are not in Pure Illusion.

The third amorphous child who replaces Yayaka. She is very lively and gets along well with TT-392.

Other characters

Cocona's pet rabbit. Named after the scientist.

An upperclassman in the Art Club at Cocona's school. While usually spending a lot of time painting in the art room by herself, her personality changes after Cocona and Papika alter things within her Pure Illusion world.

Cocona's grandmother who has looked after her since her parents died. This turns out to be a ruse, however, as she is actually a robot part of Asclepius.

A mysterious girl who was Papika's previous partner. She is revealed to be Cocona's mother, who possesses Cocona after all the amorphous fragments are gathered. Mimi is shown to have lived her life in the Asclepius factory, as an experiment, due to her ability to go to Pure Illusion. Her love and protective nature of her daughter cause her to lose sanity and disrupt the balance between Pure Illusion and reality. In order to protect Cocona from being taken away, she develops another personality by giving into her power. However, this new personality becomes the main antagonist.

Media

Anime
The series by  aired in Japan between October 6, 2016, and December 29, 2016, and ran for 13 episodes. It is licensed in North America by Sentai Filmworks and was simulcast by Hulu, Crunchyroll, and the Anime Network. The opening theme is "Serendipity" by ZAQ, while the ending theme is "Flip Flap Flip Flap" by To-Mas feat. Chima. The anime was released across six Blu-ray & DVD volumes. MVM Films released the series in the United Kingdom.

Episode list

Reception
Miles Thomas of Crunchyroll argued that each episode of the show focuses on "homosexual tropes" and gives an insight into "Cocona's coming-to-terms with her suppressed sexuality," saying it is part of the show's focus on gender identity struggles of queer people, specifically of Cocona and Papika. Carlos Ross of THEM Anime Reviews was more critical of the series. On one hand, he said that the series is "hyperkinetic, visually inventive, chock-full of references...and at times emotionally hard-hitting" but on the other hand he said it had "crass pandering to otaku audiences," saying that the show has a problem of "the fetishization of middle school girls." Ross said that the series intentionally uses imagery from the yuri genre, which is at times "virtually comedic" and called Papika's nudity to be a deliberate use of fan service, arguing it "cheapens and demeans" the plot. He added that these criticisms, he liked the character development, especially of Cocona and Papika, the openness of same-sex attraction in the anime, with scenes which invoke Nausicaa, Madoka Magica, Maria Watches Over Us and Kill La Kill. Nick Creamer of Anime News Network called the series "inherently rare and special" as an anime passion project which was "beautiful, original, and altogether stunning." He argued that the show is a coming-of-age story touching on how our families define us, how the world views us, and how we begin to love ourselves, containing a "multi-generational love story," broken homes, and a rebuke of "how society reinforces our fear of honest self-expression." Creamer also said that the show stands as "a remarkable union of emotional intent and visual execution" even as it is "pretty messy" by having occasional fan service, and music that isn't memorable. Even so, he said that he found himself "stunned" by everything the show accomplishes and attempts, with references to Neon Genesis Evangelion and Penguindrum, grading the sub, dub, story, animation, and art an "A," the music a "B+," while praising the "purposeful visual storytelling" and criticizing the "occasional fanservice."

Notes

References

External links
 

3Hz
Comedy anime and manga
Anime with original screenplays
Madman Entertainment anime
Magical girl anime and manga
Sentai Filmworks
Tokyo MX original programming
Yuri (genre) anime and manga